Polyserena is the 2002 debut studio album by Australian band George. Polyserena debuted atop the national albums chart. George became only the tenth Australian band to do so with a debut album. It achieved gold record status within ten days, and platinum record status within three weeks. By the end of 2002, the album had gone double platinum.

Track listing
"Release"
"Breaking It Slowly"
"Special Ones"
"Rain"
"Truth"
"Bastard Son"
"Strange Days"
"Chemical Dreams"
"Sellout"
"Run"
"Breathe in Now"
"That's When You Come to Me"
"Spawn"

Charts and certifications

Weekly charts

Year-end charts

Certifications

References

2002 debut albums
ARIA Award-winning albums
George (band) albums